Évrard Chauveau (1660–1739) was a French painter, the son of François Chauveau.

He was born in Paris in 1660, and studied under his father and Henri Lefebvre. He was largely employed at Gaillon by Archbishop Colbert, and in 1695 went to Sweden, where he painted many ceilings and decorations for the palaces of the Queen and nobles. He died in Paris in 1739.

References
 

1660 births
1739 deaths
Painters from Paris
17th-century French painters
French male painters
18th-century French painters
18th-century French male artists